2002 hurricane season may refer to: 

2002 Atlantic hurricane season
2002 Pacific hurricane season

In sports:

 the 2002 season of the Miami Hurricanes football team